Fred Hissong Jr.  (born 22 September 1931) is a retired lieutenant general in the United States Army. He served as deputy executive director for conventional ammunition and deputy commanding general of the United States Army Materiel Command.

Hissong is a 1950 graduate of Liberty Township High School. He is an alumnus of Ohio State University, having received a B.S. degree in personnel management and administration in 1954. Hissong later earned an M.B.A. degree in industrial management from Babson College.

References

1931 births
Living people
People from Hancock County, Ohio
Ohio State University alumni
Babson College alumni
United States Army generals